Leave the Light On is the debut EP by American country music artist Bailey Zimmerman. It was released on October 14, 2022, via Warner Music Nashville. Despite receiving mixed critical reviews upon release, it debuted in the top ten of the Billboard 200. His number one hits on the country music airplay charts include: Fall in Love, Rock and a Hard Place.

Content 
The EP was preceded by the singles "Fall in Love" and "Rock and a Hard Place", the former of which charted in the top 10 on Country Airplay. It was also preceded by the songs "Where It Ends" and "Never Leave." Zimmerman co-wrote all but two of the EP's tracks.

Critical reception 
Stephen Thomas Erlewine of AllMusic praised the song "From the Fall" as offering "slight echoes of sighing '70s soft rock, offering an appealing bit of sweetening", but was critical of the EP overall, such as the song "Where it Ends" in which Zimmerman's vocals and guitar play were compared to that of "a Southern-fried Chad Kroeger".

Lesley Janes of The Nash News offered a more positive review, stating in part, "The way he sings about true heartbreak feels authentic and new at the same time".

Commercial performance 
Leave the Light On debuted at number nine on the Billboard 200, as well as number two on Top Country Albums, earning 32,000 album equivalent units in its first week. It also debuted at number eight on Canadian Albums.

Track listing

Charts

Weekly charts

Year-end charts

Certifications

References 

2022 debut EPs
Warner Records EPs